Tram is an unincorporated community in Floyd County, Kentucky, United States.

It stands at an elevation of 820' and is on Eastern Daylight Time.

References

Unincorporated communities in Floyd County, Kentucky
Unincorporated communities in Kentucky